Arctic ecology is the scientific study of the relationships between biotic and abiotic factors in the arctic, the region north of the Arctic Circle (66 33’). This region is characterized by stressful conditions as a result of extreme cold, low precipitation, a limited growing season (50–90 days) and virtually no sunlight throughout the winter. The Arctic consists of taiga (or boreal forest) and tundra biomes, which also dominate very high elevations, even in the tropics. Sensitive ecosystems exist throughout the Arctic region, which are being impacted dramatically by global warming.

The earliest inhabitants of the Arctic were the Neanderthal sub-species. Since then, many indigenous populations have inhabited the region, which continues to this day. Since the early 1900s, when Vilhjalmur Stefansson led the first major Canadian Arctic Expedition, the Arctic has been a valued area for ecological research.

In 1946, The Arctic Research Laboratory was established in Point Barrow, Alaska under the contract of the Office of Naval Research. This launched an interest in exploring the Arctic examining animal cycles, permafrost and the interactions between indigenous peoples and the Arctic ecology. During the Cold War, the Arctic became a place where the United States, Canada, and the Soviet Union performed significant research that has been essential to the study of climate change in recent years. A major reason why research in the Arctic is essential for the study of climate change is because the effects of climate change will be felt more quickly and more drastically in higher latitudes of the world as above average temperatures are predicted for Northwest Canada and Alaska. From an anthropological point of view, researchers study the native Inuit of Alaska as they have become extremely accustomed to adapting to ecological and climate variability.

Arctic environment
To understand Arctic ecology, it is important to consider both the terrestrial and oceanic aspects of the region. A few important parts of this environment are sea ice and permafrost.

Sea ice is frozen seawater that moves with oceanic currents. It provides important habitat and a resting place for animals, particularly during the winter months. Over time, small pockets of seawater get trapped in the ice, and the salt is squeezed out. This causes the ice to become progressively less salty. Sea ice persists throughout the year, but there is less ice available during summer months.

Large portions of the land are also frozen during the year. Permafrost is substrate that has been frozen for a minimum of 2 years. There are two types of permafrost: discontinuous and continuous. Discontinuous permafrost is found in areas where the mean annual air temperature is only slightly below freezing; this forms in sheltered locations. In areas where the mean annual soil surface temperature is below , continuous permafrost forms. The top layer is called the active layer. It thaws in the summer and is critical to plant life.

Biomes
Moisture and temperature are major physical drivers of natural ecosystems. The more arid and colder conditions found at higher northern latitudes (and high elevations elsewhere) support tundra and boreal forests. The water in this region is generally frozen and evaporation rates are very low. Species diversity, nutrient availability, precipitation, and average temperatures increase as you move from the tundra to boreal forests and then to deciduous temperate ecosystems, which are found south of these Arctic biomes.

Tundra
Tundra is found from 55 ° to 80° N latitude in North America, Eurasia and Greenland. It can be found at lower latitudes at high elevations as well. Plant species supported by tundra have small leaves, are short (74 mm to <5 m), tend to be deciduous, and have a high ratio of roots to shoots. They are composed mainly of perennial forbs, dwarf shrubs, grasses, lichens, and mosses.

Boreal
In comparison to tundra, boreal forest has a longer and warmer growing season and supports larger species diversity, an increase in canopy height, vegetation density, and biomass. Boreal conditions can be found across northern North America and Eurasia. The boreal forests in the interior of the continents grow on top of permafrost due to very cold winters (see drunken trees), while much of the boreal forest has patchy permafrost or lack permafrost completely. Shrubs, herbs, ferns, mosses, and lichens are also important species. Stand-replacing crown fires are very important to this biome, occurring as frequently as every 50–100 years in some parts.

Adaptations to conditions

Humans
Humans living in the Arctic region generally rely on warm clothing and buildings to protect them from the elements. Acclimatization, or the adjustment to new conditions, appears to be the most common form of adaptation to cold environments. No genetic advantage has been found when different people groups or races are compared. There is no evidence that fat is grown in response to cold, although its presence is advantageous. Amazingly, most people living in the Arctic region live a lifestyle very connected to the environment, spending significant time outside and depending heavily on hunting and fishing.

Other animals
Animals that are active in the winter have adaptations for surviving the intense cold. A common example is the presence of strikingly large feet in proportion to body weight. These act like snowshoes, and can be found on animals like the snowshoe hare and caribou. Many of the animals in the Arctic are larger than their temperate counterparts (Bergmann’s rule), taking advantage of the smaller ratio of surface area to volume that comes with increasing size. This increases the ability to conserve heat. Layers of fat, plumage, and fur are also very effective insulators to help retain warmth and are common in Arctic animals including polar bears and marine mammals. Some animals also have digestive adaptations to improve their ability to digest woody plants either with or without the aid of microbial organisms. This is highly advantageous during the winter months when most soft vegetation is beneath the snow pack.

Not all Arctic animals directly face the rigors of winter. Many migrate to warmer climates at lower latitudes, while others avoid the difficulties of winter by hibernating until spring. Although these options might seem to be easy solutions to the difficulties of surviving an extreme environment, both are very expensive in terms of energy and risk of predation.

Plants
One of the most serious problems that plants face is ice crystal formation in the cells, which results in tissue death. Plants have two ways to resist freezing: avoid it or tolerate it. Plants have several avoidance mechanisms to prevent freezing. It can build up insulation, have its stem close to the ground, use the insulation from snow cover, and supercool. After water reaches , it spontaneously freezes and plant tissue is destroyed. This is called the nucleation point. The nucleation point can be lowered if dissolved solutes are present.

Alternatively, plants have several different ways to tolerate freezing. Some plants allow freezing by allowing extracellular, but not intracellular freezing. Plants let water freeze in extracellular spaces, which creates a high vapor deficit that pulls water vapor out of the cell. This process dehydrates the cell and allows it to survive temperatures well below .

Another problem associated with extreme cold is cavitation. Ring-porous wood is susceptible to cavitation because the large pores that are used for water transport easily freeze. Cavitation is much less of problem in trees with ring-diffuse wood. In ring-diffuse wood, there is a reduced risk of cavitation, as transport pores are smaller. The trade-off is that these species are not able to transport water as efficiently.

History of Arctic ecology

Early history
Many different peoples had inhabited present-day Canada and Alaska by AD 1000. Most of these people lived by hunting, gathering and fishing; agriculture was not done often in the region. Most of these peoples were nomadic and their activity was largely seasonal. Early Archaic Culture influenced the Plano Culture by about 8000 BC. The Plano peoples and other cultural groups stemming from the Archaic Culture were notable for their use of spear-throwing technology, which likely made them able to maintain larger populations and expand their access to different foods. By AD 1000, the indigenous Arctic inhabitants have also developed other tools that improved their standard of living, such as fire which was set to the woodlands to be used to drive deer to be hunted.

In the late eighteenth and early nineteenth centuries, English scientist William Scoresby explored the Arctic and wrote reports on its meteorology, zoology and geophysics. Around this time, the Arctic region was becoming a major subject of imperial science. Though permanent observatories were not yet established, traveling scientists began to gather magnetic data in the Arctic in the early nineteenth century. In June 1831, Sir James Ross and a group of Eskimos explored the Booth Peninsula in order to determine the exact location of the Magnetic North Pole. In the European Arctic, however, Scandinavian powers collected most of the scientific data as a result of early colonies established by Norsemen in Iceland and Greenland. Scientific expeditions to the Arctic started to happen more frequently by the middle of the nineteenth century. From 1338 to 1840, French La Recherche went on an expedition to the North Atlantic with a team of French, Danish, Norwegian and Swedish scientists. Between 1856 and 1914, the Swedes made about twenty-five expeditions to the Arctic island of Spitsbergen in Norway. As the Swedes expanded their influence in Spitsbergen, they used the area for economic as well as scientific motives through mining and resource extraction. During this time, the United States, Russia, Great Britain, Austria, Switzerland, Norway, and Germany also started to become more active in Spitsbergen.

Modern history
In 1946, The Arctic Research Laboratory was established under the contract of the Office of Naval Research in Point Barrow, Alaska for the purpose of investigating the physical and biological phenomena unique to the Arctic. In 1948, Dr. Laurence Irving was appointed as the Scientific Director of the Arctic Research Laboratory and put in charge of coordinating various projects. Scientists performed fieldwork to collect data that linked new observations to prior widely accepted knowledge. Through the processes of soil sampling, surveying and photographing landscapes and distributing salmon tags, scientists demonstrated the significance of historical case studies in the study of environmental science. The ability to compare past and present data allowed scientists to understand the causes and effects of ecological changes. Around this time, geographers from McGill University were developing new methods of studying geography in the North. As laboratory research was beginning to trump field research, McGill geographers implemented use of aviation in research, helping knowledge production to occur in the laboratory instead of in the field. Aviation allowed researchers to remould the way they studied the Northern landscape and  indigenous people. Quick and easy travel using aircraft also promoted an integration of the Northern science with Southern community-based science, while changing the scale of ecology being studied. The ability to photograph, and observe the Arctic from an aircraft, provided researchers with a larger scope that allowed them to see a massive amount of space at one time, while also asserting objectivity. A photograph produces evidence, similar to laboratory data, yet it can be understood, circulated and accepted by the common people due to its aesthetic value.

During the Cold War, the Canadian government began taking initiatives to secure the continent, and to assert territorial authority over northern Canada, including the Arctic, which at the time had a dominant American presence. The Canadian government demonstrated their desire for national dominance and security by requiring permission from other nations to utilize their land for military initiatives. They also supported and implemented civilian initiatives including resource development, wildlife conservation and the social and economic development of indigenous peoples. In 1950’s, ecologist Charles Elton was drawn to the Arctic to study the existence, causes and effects of cycles in animal populations, while ecologists Frank Banfield and John Kelsal studied the factors, especially human impacts, influencing hunting and game populations on animals such as caribou. The 1960s and 1970s brought a decrease in the desire to protect the Arctic as it was seen to lack a significant amount of biodiversity. This allowed for scientists to extend further research in the area. In June 1960, the Cold Regions Research and Engineering Laboratory (CRREL) was constructed, headed by General Duncan Hallock and the U.S. Army Corps of Engineers. The two predecessor organizations that made up the CRREL were the Arctic Construction and Frost Effects Laboratory (ACFEL), and the Snow, Ice and Permafrost Research Establishment (SIPRE). The goal of the CREEL laboratory was to bring together the ACFEL and SIPRE to expand the size and scientific reputation of these organizations, solve problems in cold regions and explore the basic environmental characteristics of cold regions. As a result, study and management of the Arctic was taken over by consulting firms hired and controlled by the government.

Indigenous peoples and research
As research in the Arctic region of northern North America became more frequent, conflicts between researchers and the indigenous peoples started to occur. Recently, the indigenous communities of the North American Arctic have played a direct role in setting ethical standards for research in the region. Scientists have combined the use of laboratory research and field research in the Polar Regions to gain a more comprehensive understanding of its characteristics. Because of scientific research in the north, living in and traveling to the Arctic has become much safer. However, the indigenous peoples viewed the effects of the research and development in the area differently than the scientists did. Since the 1960s, indigenous peoples have been more politically active and began pursuing the recognition of their rights regarding land-claims and self-government institutions. Indigenous communities voiced their concern that this research could lead to undesirable changes to the region’s landscape and economy. Canadian officials responded to their concerns by addressing the responsibility of scientists to consult with indigenous communities before conducting research. In 1977, the Association of Canadian Universities for Northern Studies (ACUNS) was founded at Churchill, Manitoba to improve scientific activity in the region. ACUNS published a document aimed at promoting cooperation between the northern indigenous people and researchers called Ethical Principles for the Conduct of Research in the North (1982). The document was published in English, French, and Inuktitut so it could be clearly understood among different groups. Relationships between science and society in the Arctic continue to change and adapt based on the politics of the region.

Human ecology in the Arctic
Evidence has been found of early humans in the early Würm-Weichsel period hunting large Arctic mammals in the Ice Age steppes of northern Europe. However, it is still unclear whether these humans were just temporary migrants or inhabitants of Arctic colonies at the time.

The earliest inhabitants of the polar regions were the Neanderthals, or Homo neanderthalensis, who are considered to be an intermediate stage between Homo erectus and Homo sapiens sapiens. The Neanderthals made advances in the basic production of stone, bone antler and flint tools, which archaeologists call a Mousterian industry. About 40,000 years ago, the Neanderthals quickly disappeared and were replaced by modern humans, Homo sapiens sapiens. Just a few thousand years after the sudden disappearance of the Neanderthals, modern humans occupied all the land that their predecessors had occupied. Some scientists believe that the Neanderthals were overcome by the incoming modern race, commonly called Cro-Magnon people, while others believe the race disappeared by integrating itself within the new population.

The Rapid cooling the earliest inhabitants felt signaled an early onset of the Little Ice Age of the 1300s. This caused the sea ice to expand making traveling through Greenland and Iceland impossible to manage. This trapped the people in their homes and settlements which made trading come to a stop (National Snow and Ice Data Center, 2020). Because of this, the people have adapted very well to these conditions. It is seen through their use of animal hides in their clothing, tree branches used to make tepee shelters, and their use of ice blocks to make igloos to trap heat (Reference, 2020). in certain areas of the Arctic, many big-footed animals leave tracks and trails behind that lead to plants and trees filled with roots, berries, nuts and other foods needed to survive. Hunters are easily able to find their source of foods because of this (Scholastic, 1961). It is extremely important for a hunter to be smart and really take in their surroundings. They must watch the way animals move and where their prey may be located. They must also keep their eye open for the way the sea moves as well as the weather if they plan to fish or hunt near the water (Vitebsky 2000). Because the temperature can be very extreme, it is very important to become accustomed to the climate. Temperatures can drop to as cold as below 50 degrees and may only rise to approximately 50 degrees during their summers (Business Insider, 2015).

The Aurignacoid (upper Paleolithic tool-making) tradition of the modern people is most associated with a feature called blade-and-core technology. According to Quaternary scientist C.V. Haynes, Arctic cave art also dates back to the Aurignacoid phase and climaxes during the end of the Pleistocene, which encompasses subjects such as hunting and spirituality. People stemming from the Clovis culture populated northern regions of Canada and formed what led to the Northern Archaic and Maritime Archaic traditions at the end of the Late Glacial period. Recently, small flint tools and artifacts from about 5,000 years ago were discovered that belonged to a culture now generally called the Arctic Small Tool tradition. The ASTt people are believed to be the physical and cultural ancestors of modern arctic Inuit.

In the late eighteenth and early nineteenth century, as European trade interests among the Northwest Company and the Hudson's Bay Company expanded into northern Canada, arctic indigenous peoples began to become more involved in the trade process. Increasingly more European goods, including kettles, iron tools, tobacco, alcohol, and guns, were bought and traded by the indigenous peoples within their communities. European imports in exchange for more primitive, native resources and tools made life for the indigenous more efficient and comfortable. Native societies in the early eighteenth century also began to buy guns from European traders, and these guns made hunting easier. They were also occasionally used in native etiquette, medicinal, and religious practices. Because of the natives' increased hunting efficiency, scarcity of resources became an issue in the region, a version of what American human ecologist Garrett Hardin called "the tragedy of the commons."

The Arctic peoples value spiritual connections with their environment, which leads to a spiritual understanding along with their scientific understanding. Their lifestyles, therefore, reflect not only activity that is economically efficient but also that which is in line with their spiritual beliefs and values. The Alaskan Athabascan people, for example, spiritually value the moose. State law acknowledges this spiritual belief and allows people to take moose for potlatches outside of the usual hunting season. The indigenous peoples of the Arctic drawn from scientific, emotional and spiritual sources of information, which often does not agree with non-indigenous scientific observations.

Conservation and environmental issues
Suspected worldwide anthropogenic climate change has been particularly evident in the Arctic. This is evident by warmer temperatures, melting glaciers, shorter durations of sea ice and changing weather and storm patterns. Scientists are especially concerned about four aspects of the continued projected warming of the Arctic.

First, thermohaline circulation is a series of underwater oceanic currents fueled by the salinity and temperature of seawater. Melting ice sheets would introduce vast amounts of fresh water into the North Atlantic, causing a change in density which could disrupt the currents. If this circulation slowed or stopped, the climates of northern Europe and North America would be strongly impacted.

Second, the melting of glaciers and sea ice is disrupting the lifestyles of a wide range of species. Polar bears live on the sea ice for much of the year and find their food in the surrounding ocean waters. Recent projections suggest that global warming will lead to the disappearance of most summer sea ice within 40 years.

A third practical concern is the melting of permafrost due to climate change. Degradation of this permafrost is leading to major ground surface subsidence and pounding. The ground is literally melting away in many regions of the Arctic. The locations of towns and communities that have been inhabited for centuries are now in jeopardy. A condition known as drunken tree syndrome is being caused by this melting. Ground water and river runoffs are being negatively impacted as well. Although warming conditions might increase  uptake for photosynthetic organisms in some places, scientists are concerned that melting permafrost will also release large amounts of carbon locked in permafrost. Higher temperatures increase soil decomposition and if soil decomposition becomes higher than net primary production, global atmospheric carbon dioxide will in turn increase. Atmospheric sinks in the water table are also being reduced as the permafrost melts and decreases the height of the water table in the Arctic.

Finally, the impacts of the release of carbon from the permafrost could be amplified by high levels of deforestation in the Boreal forests in Eurasia and Canada. This biome currently serves as a large carbon sink, sequestering large amounts of carbon dioxide. However, over half of the original forest has been or in danger of harvesting, largely for export. Carbon Dioxide is a greenhouse gas, which facilitates increased warming of the earth.

Arctic Biodiversity and Climate Change 

Climate change has drastically altered many parts of the planet, especially at the poles, including the Arctic. It has directly and indirectly affected a variety of species that are a part of the Arctic marine ecosystem. Due to the shifts in temperature and other ecological conditions, there have also been new species introduced into the ecosystem (Chan 2018).

Climate change has led to an increase in the number of non-indigenous species (NIS) introduced to the Arctic. Between 1960 and 2015, there have been between 0-4 NIS discovered each year. But parts of the Arctic, such as the Iceland Shelf have had a greater number of introductions and discoveries per year at around 14 NIS (Chan 2018). The aquatic species introduced accounted for 39% of the NIS species introduced to the Arctic region. This migration of NIS species has been attributed to climate change inducing human activities such as shipping, aquaculture, stocking, and building canals (Chan 2018). These NIS introductions have been labeled a major threat to global biodiversity (Rotter 2020). Climate change has directly and indirectly decreased the general productivity of native species like the Eskimo curlew while increasing the number of noninvasive species introduced further altering ecosystem dynamics (Chan 2018).

Climate change has also been responsible for rising sea levels, changes in ocean currents, variations in temperature, and the amount of existing sea-ice (Barber 2008). These habitat and condition alterations in the Arctic and also in areas outside of it have threatened many different species, especially migratory birds along the East Asian flyway, which is a route frequently used by many bird species and is protected by various countries (Yong 2021). The Eskimo curlew, which is a kind of bird, has gone nearly extinct due to overharvesting outside of the Arctic. With the sea levels also on the rise and an increased rate of coastal development, coastal and intertidal habitats have been on a decline, reducing the density of the species that rely on these conditions to survive (Yong 2021).

Arctic marine ecosystems are critical for global biodiversity with habitats consisting of species, over 2000 algal species, and tens of thousands of microbial species (Michel 2018). This diverse array of species have utilized the various Arctic conditions including ice shelves, ice covers, cold seeps, and hot vents to survive. The major and rapid changes to these ecosystems due to climate change have resulted in increased river runoff, rain, permafrost and glacier melt. These rapid changes paired with land development have pressured the Arctic ecosystems, leading to massive losses in biodiversity (Michel 2018). This has a direct and deleterious impact on marine ecosystems.

The Arctic has historically been deemed a low risk region for NIS invasion due to its harsh conditions, limited food sources, and limited access, which in turn resulted in low chances of survival and growth for the NIS (Chan 2018). Due to the recent increases in the amount of human development paired with the melting of the ice due to climate change, the Arctic has been experiencing a more temperate climate. This has led to a higher survival rate for Southern species or NIS since the conditions have become more survivable for these species. This might seem to be a positive outcome since there is an increase in short-term biodiversity. But in the long-term, the natural ecosystem and food webs are devastated since there are new sources of resource and land depletion (Solan 2020).

Long-term mitigation strategies need to be implemented to help monitor the species richness in areas such as the Arctic to understand the trends in biodiversity and how different local strategies that have been implemented either benefit or harm the ecosystem (Gill 2011). A mitigation strategy that can be beneficial in the protection of local biodiversity and reducing the introduction of NIS is making activities such as transportation that bring the NIS to the Arctic  more efficient. (Dafforn 2011). Antifouling technologies involve specialized paints being applied to a ship’s hull to slow marine growth on the underwater area (Tripathi 2016). This technology has become more popular in recent years. These paints incorporate different biocides such as lead and copper and can help prevent settlement of different NIS on vehicles that transport goods to Arctic regions (Dafforn 2011). This process indirectly lowers the amount of NIS transferred to the Arctic by humans. This, however, does introduce chemicals into the marine environment causing various issues, which is why the use, quantity, and location of the biocides must be thoroughly considered and mitigated.

The biodiversity loss and ways to mitigate it can not be overly generalized, however, because each region of the Arctic and the species in those regions interact with various regional physicochemical conditions that strongly impact how they react to climate change (Michel 2018). The loss of biodiversity, however, is evident and does greatly impact the overall Arctic aquatic ecosystems and the Arctic food web.

Further exploration
In a meta analysis of the published work in aquatic ecosystems since the term biodiversity appeared in the bibliography, the Arctic and Antarctic Polar regions were found to be still unexplored. In addition, the North Pacific Ocean (Pacific Northeast and Pacific Northwest), still has few citations in comparison to its large size. This limits our perception of the world’s aquatic biodiversity. Consequently, we do not have sufficient information about biodiversity in most places on earth. Even though biodiversity declines from the equator to the poles in terrestrial ecosystems, this is still a hypothesis to be tested in aquatic and especially marine ecosystems where causes of this phenomenon are unclear. In addition, particularly in marine ecosystems, there are several well stated cases where diversity in higher latitudes actually increases (Moustakas & Karakassis 2005). Therefore, the lack of information on biodiversity of Arctic Regions prevents scientific conclusions on the distribution of the world’s aquatic biodiversity.

See also

Arctic sea ice ecology and history
Arctic shrinkage

References

External links
http://www.blueplanetbiomes.org/tundra.htm
https://web.archive.org/web/20090615004548/http://www.windows.ucar.edu/tour/link%3D/earth/polar/polar_north.html%26edu%3Dhigh
http://www.borealnet.org/overview/index.html 
https://web.archive.org/web/20070610151037/http://apollo.ogis.state.me.us/catalog/
http://fairbanks-alaska.com/permafrost.htm

Life in the Cold
http://apollo.ogis.state.me.us/catalog/ 
Moustakas, A. & I. Karakassis. How diverse is aquatic biodiversity research?, Aquatic Ecology, 39, 367-375

Environment of the Arctic
Tundra
Taiga and boreal forests
Flora of the Arctic
Environmental science
Ecological experiments
Ecology by biogeographic realm